Charles Greene Bittick Jr. (November 2, 1939 – April 28, 2005) was an American water polo player and swimmer. He was a member of the American water polo team that finished seventh at the 1960 Olympics. He played five matches and scored three goals. He won three silver medals, two in the 100 m backstroke and one in water polo, at the Pan American Games in 1959–63. In 1960, Bittick briefly held the world record in the 200 m backstroke, and in 1961 he won the 400 yd medley event at the AAU championships, setting a new national record. After retiring from competitions he settled in Yorba Linda, California, where he worked as a broker for Farmer's Insurance. He remained active in recreational sports, and in 1997 climbed Mount Rainier; he also crossed the Sea of Cortés in a kayak, together with his brother.

In 1979, he was inducted into the USA Water Polo Hall of Fame.

References

External links
 

1939 births
2005 deaths
American male water polo players
Olympic water polo players of the United States
Swimmers at the 1959 Pan American Games
Water polo players at the 1960 Summer Olympics
Swimmers at the 1963 Pan American Games
USC Trojans men's water polo players
USC Trojans men's swimmers
Pan American Games silver medalists for the United States
American male backstroke swimmers
Pan American Games medalists in swimming
Medalists at the 1959 Pan American Games
Medalists at the 1963 Pan American Games
20th-century American people
21st-century American people